Richard Payne BDec (died 1507) was a Canon of Windsor, England, from 1499 to 1507

Career

He was appointed:
Prebendary of Minor Pars Altaris in Salisbury 1490
Queen's Almoner
Master of St Katherine's Hospital by the Tower 1499
Rector of Debden, Essex

He was appointed to the fifth stall in St George's Chapel, Windsor Castle in 1499 and held the canonry until 1507.

Notes 

1507 deaths
Canons of Windsor
Year of birth unknown